The Museu Frederic Marès  is an art and sculpture museum in Barcelona, Spain.

The Museu contains a collection of thousands of items from the sculptor Frederic Marès. Located near the Barcelona Cathedral, the Museu collection includes statuary from pre-Roman times through to almost the present day, with a particular emphasis on medieval Christian art, and a separate 'Collector's Cabinet' of artisan items such as fans and keys.

References

Museums in Barcelona
Museums established in 1946
Mares